The R435 road is a regional road in Ireland linking Borris-in-Ossory, County Laois to the R693 south of Johnstown, County Kilkenny. It passes through the town of Rathdowney County Laois en route. It joins the M7 motorway at junction 21, 1km south of Borris-in-Ossory.

See also
Roads in Ireland
National primary road
National secondary road

References
Roads Act 1993 (Classification of Regional Roads) Order 2006 – Department of Transport

Regional roads in the Republic of Ireland
Roads in County Laois
Roads in County Kilkenny